The 1967 National Soccer League season was the forty-fourth season under the National Soccer League (NSL) name. The season began in early May and concluded in early November with Windsor Teutonia successfully defending the O’Keefe Trophy (NSL Championship) against Hamilton Primos. The regular-season title was clinched by Hamilton Primos by finishing first throughout the regular season.  

The NSL merged with its competitor the Eastern Canada Professional Soccer League (ECPSL) in December 1966, which elevated the status of the NSL in the Canadian soccer landscape to a secondary league behind the American-based National Professional Soccer League, and the United Soccer Association.

Overview 
The financial instability of the Eastern Canada Professional Soccer League was becoming more apparent as key club members Toronto City, and Toronto Italia-Falcons departed to soccer leagues based in the United States (National Professional Soccer League, and United Soccer Association). In late December 1966, the ECPSL merged with the National Soccer League with their remaining active clubs Hamilton Primos, and Toronto Inter-Roma joining the Ontario-based circuit. The acquisition of the ECPSL clubs along with the return of Toronto Olympia, and an expansion club increased the membership to 12 clubs. The twelfth member known as the Serbian White Eagles was the expansion club that represented the Serbian community in Toronto. Several reforms were presented at the annual owners meeting with the proposal of a promotion and relegation system, and a partitioning of the league into two separate divisions. The league also received an inquiry from American interests in attempts of acquiring an NSL franchise.  

Throughout the season a dispute emerged over Toronto Roma's usage of illegal players. The dispute centered around the usage of Carlos Metidieri, and Jorge Piotti, as both were signed to Boston Rovers of the United Soccer Association, and failed to receive permission from the Canadian Soccer Football Association in the usage of these contracted players. The league in response issued a fine and suspension to both players, and an additional fine to the Toronto Roma. Roma's defense was that the club received permission from Boston in the usage of both players. Toronto challenged the ruling and threatened to withdraw from the league. The league had a slight increase in match attendance since their initial decrease in the early 1960s.

Teams

Coaching changes

Standings

Playoffs 
The preliminary round of the playoffs was contested in a round-robin style with two separate groups where the two group winners would qualify for the final. Sudbury Italia, Toronto Roma, and Windsor Teutonia were placed in the first group, while Hamilton Primos, Toronto Hellas, and Toronto Hungaria were placed in the second group. Toronto Roma would withdraw from the playoffs. Windsor and Hamilton finished as their respective group champions, and as a result, qualified for the O’Keefe Trophy final. The championship final was contested in a best-of-three series.

Finals

References

External links
RSSSF CNSL page
thecnsl.com - 1967 season

1967–68 domestic association football leagues
National Soccer League
1967